The Kota Bharu District is a district in northern Kelantan, Malaysia. As of 2020, the district's population is estimated to be 608,600. It contains the state capital, Kota Bharu, as well as Pengkalan Chepa and Ketereh.

Kota Bharu district is surrounded by six other districts, namely Bachok District, Pasir Puteh District, Machang District, Pasir Mas District and Tumpat District clockwise.

Municipal areas
Kota Bharu region contains two municipal areas within its borders:
 Islamic City of Kota Bharu Municipal Council (Majlis Perbandaran Kota Bharu Bandaraya Islam, MPKB-BRI), which manages downtown Kota Bharu, Pengkalan Chepa and Kubang Kerian; and
 Ketereh District Council  (Majlis Daerah Ketereh, MDKetereh), which administers the southern part of Kota Bharu District, including the Salor salient, Ketereh and Kok Lanas.

Population

In 2010, Kota Bharu has a population of 491,237 people. By 2020, its population has risen to 608,600.

Ranking Population of Kota Bharu District (Jajahan), 2010.

Politics 
Kota Bharu is represented in the Parliament of Malaysia. For electoral purposes, the district is divided into four constituencies in the Kota Bharu electoral region. Each constituency elects one Member of Parliament (MP) by the first-past-the-post system of election.

Federal Parliament and State Assembly Seats 
List of Kota Bharu district representatives in the Federal Parliament (Dewan Rakyat)

List of Kota Bharu district representatives in the State Legislative Assembly (Dewan Undangan Negeri)

References